Hoseyniyeh (also Romanized as Ḩoseynīyeh; also known as Ḩoseyn-e Gorg, Ḩoseyn Gorg, and Husain Kurk) is a village in Sang Sefid Rural District, Qareh Chay District, Khondab County, Markazi Province, Iran. At the 2006 census, its population was 517, in 114 families.

References 

Populated places in Khondab County